In the mathematical theory of functional analysis, the Krein–Milman theorem is a proposition about compact convex sets in locally convex topological vector spaces (TVSs).

This theorem generalizes to infinite-dimensional spaces and to arbitrary compact convex sets the following basic observation: a convex (i.e. "filled") triangle, including its perimeter and the area "inside of it", is equal to the convex hull of its three vertices, where these vertices are exactly the extreme points of this shape. 
This observation also holds for any other convex polygon in the plane

Statement and definitions

Preliminaries and definitions

Throughout,  will be a real or complex vector space.

An interval is said to be  or proper if its endpoints are distinct. 

The intervals  and  always contain their endpoints while  and  never contain either of their endpoints. 

For any  the point  is said to (strictly)   and  if  belongs to the open line segment  

For example, the vertices of any convex polygon in the plane  are the extreme points of that polygon. 

 
where the right hand side denotes the closure of  while the left hand side is notation. 
For example, the convex hull of any set of three distinct points forms either a closed line segment (if they are collinear) or else a solid (that is, "filled") triangle, including its perimeter. 
And in the plane  the unit circle is  convex but the closed unit disk is convex and furthermore, this disk is equal to the convex hull of the circle.

The separable Hilbert space Lp space  of square-summable sequences with the usual norm  has a compact subset  whose convex hull  is  closed and thus also  compact. However, like in all complete Hausdorff locally convex spaces, the  convex hull  of this compact subset will be compact. But if a Hausdorff locally convex space is not complete then it is in general  guaranteed that  will be compact whenever  is; an example can even be found in a (non-complete) pre-Hilbert vector subspace of  Every compact subset is totally bounded (also called "precompact") and the closed convex hull of a totally bounded subset of a Hausdorff locally convex space is guaranteed to be totally bounded.

Statement

In the case where the compact set  is also convex, the above theorem has as a corollary the first part of the next theorem, which is also often called the Krein–Milman theorem.

The convex hull of the extreme points of  forms a convex subset of  so the main burden of the proof is to show that there are enough extreme points so that their convex hull covers all of  
For this reason, the following corollary to the above theorem is also often called the Krein–Milman theorem. 

To visualized this theorem and its conclusion, consider the particular case where  is a convex polygon. 
In this case, the corners of the polygon (which are its extreme points) are all that is needed to recover the polygon shape. 
The statement of the theorem is false if the polygon is not convex, as then there are many ways of drawing a polygon having given points as corners.

The requirement that the convex set  be compact can be weakened to give the following strengthened generalization version of the theorem. 

Compactness implies convex compactness because a topological space is compact if and only if every family of closed subsets having the finite intersection property (FIP) has non-empty intersection (that is, its kernel is not empty). 
The definition of convex compactness is similar to this characterization of compact spaces in terms of the FIP, except that it only involves those closed subsets that are also convex (rather than all closed subsets).

More general settings

The assumption of local convexity for the ambient space is necessary, because  constructed a counter-example for the non-locally convex space  where 

However,  proved that the Krein–Milman theorem does hold for  compact CAT(0) spaces.

Related results

Relation to the axiom of choice

Under the Zermelo–Fraenkel set theory (ZF) axiomatic framework, the axiom of choice (AC) suffices to prove all version of the Krein–Milman theorem given above, including statement KM and its generalization SKM. 
The axiom of choice also implies, but is not equivalent to, the Boolean prime ideal theorem (BPI), which is equivalent to the Banach–Alaoglu theorem. 
Conversely, the Krein–Milman theorem KM together with the Boolean prime ideal theorem (BPI) imply the axiom of choice.
In summary, AC holds if and only if both KM and BPI hold.
It follows that under ZF, the axiom of choice is equivalent to the following statement:

The closed unit ball of the continuous dual space of any real normed space has an extreme point.

Furthermore, SKM together with the Hahn–Banach theorem for real vector spaces (HB) are also equivalent to the axiom of choice. It is known that BPI implies HB, but that it is not equivalent to it (said differently, BPI is strictly stronger than HB).

History

Earlier,  proved that if  is 3-dimensional then  equals the convex hull of the set of its extreme points.
The Krein–Milman theorem generalizes this to arbitrary locally convex ; however, to generalize from finite to infinite dimensional spaces, it is necessary to use the closure.

See also

Citations

Bibliography

  
  
  
 
 
  
  
  
  
  
  
  
 N. K. Nikol'skij (Ed.). Functional Analysis I. Springer-Verlag, 1992. 
  
 H. L. Royden, Real Analysis. Prentice-Hall, Englewood Cliffs, New Jersey, 1988.
  
  
  
  
  

Convex hulls
Oriented matroids
Theorems involving convexity
Theorems in convex geometry
Theorems in discrete geometry
Theorems in functional analysis
Topological vector spaces